Marlborough Park is a residential neighbourhood in the northeast quadrant of Calgary, Alberta. It is bounded by 68 Street E to the east, 52 Street E to the west, Trans-Canada Highway to the north and Memorial Drive to the south. The homonymous park is located at the center of the community.

The land was annexed by the City of Calgary in 1961 and Marlborough Park was established in 1972. It is represented in the Calgary City Council by the Ward 10 councillor.

Demographics

Residents in this community had a median household income of $52,535 in 2000, and there were 17.4% low income residents living in the neighbourhood. As of 2000, 27.6% of the residents were immigrants. A proportion of 4% of the buildings were condominiums or apartments, and 16.8% of the housing was used for renting.

Education
The community is served by Cappy Smart Elementary School, Roland Michener Elementary, Dr. Gladys McKelvie Egbert Community public schools and by St. Martha Elementary & Junior High (Catholic).

See also
List of neighbourhoods in Calgary

References

External links
Marlborough Park Community Association

Neighbourhoods in Calgary